Chamran Expressway is an expressway in northeastern Isfahan, Iran.

Streets in Isfahan